The Adare Peninsula, sometimes called the Cape Adare Peninsula, is a high ice-covered peninsula,  long, in the northeast part of Victoria Land, extending south from Cape Adare to Cape Roget. The peninsula is considered the southernmost point of the Borchgrevink Coast, named for Carsten Borchgrevink (1864-1934). The peninsula was named by the New Zealand Antarctic Place-Names Committee (NZ-APC) for Cape Adare.

The Adare Peninsula consists of overlapping shield volcanoes that have been potassium–argon dated 6 to 13 million years old. Potassium–argon dates of 2.27 million years and perhaps 1.14 million years have also been obtained. The Adare Peninsula shields form part of the Hallett Volcanic Province of the McMurdo Volcanic Group.

Named features

West coast 
Cape Adare is a prominent cape of black basalt forming the northern tip of the Adare Peninsula and the north-easternmost extremity of Victoria Land.

This was the camp site of the British Antarctic Expedition, 1898–1900, under C.E. Borchgrevink, who gave the camp his mother's maiden name. The Northern Party of the British Antarctic Expedition of 1910–13 disembarked here in 1911, and they gave the name "Ridley" to the entire beach. The beach is the site of an Adelie penguin rookery. The very west point of the beach is called Von Tunzelman Point. It was named in 1984 by NZAPC after Alexander von Tunzelman, a member of the first recorded landing in Victoria Land in 1895.

Immediately south of the beach is Boulder Rock, a large offshore rock first charted and named in 1911 by the Northern Party of the British Antarctic Expedition, 1910–13, led by Victor Campbell.  south is Seal Point, charted and named in 1911 by the Northern Party.

Inland to the south, the peninsula is bordered by the Admiralty Mountains. The Adare Saddle is located where the mountains meet the peninsula.

East coast 
Unless otherwise noted, the following features on the peninsula's east coast were discovered and named by Captain James Clark Ross in 1841.

No prominent cape exists here but for the sake of historical continuity, the name has been reapplied to these cliffs. Nestling Rock lies in the sea just south of the north portion of Adare Peninsula. The descriptive name applied by NZ-APC suggests the location of this relatively small feature beside the towering Downshire Cliffs.

Fenwick Ice Piedmont is an ice piedmont on the east side of Adare Peninsula, formed by numerous glaciers draining the east side of the peninsula between the Downshire Cliffs and Cape McCormick. It was named by NZ-APC in 2005 to honor the lengthy service given by Rob Fenwick to furthering the protection of historic sites under New Zealand's care in Antarctica. Farther to the south, Cape McCormick marks the eastern extremity of Adare Peninsula.

Cape Roget is a steep rock cape at the south tip of the east coast of Adare Peninsula, marking the north side of the entrance to Moubray Bay. It was named for Peter Mark Roget, noted English lexicographer. The cape is the site of an Emperor penguin rookery.

See also
 List of volcanoes in Antarctica

References

Peninsulas of Antarctica
Landforms of Victoria Land
Borchgrevink Coast
Pennell Coast
Volcanoes of Victoria Land
Polygenetic shield volcanoes
Miocene shield volcanoes
Pleistocene shield volcanoes